N-succinylornithine carbamoyltransferase (succinylornithine transcarbamylase, N-succinyl-L-ornithine transcarbamylase, SOTCase) is an enzyme with systematic name carbamoyl phosphate:N2-succinyl-L-ornithine carbamoyltransferase. This enzyme catalyses the following chemical reaction

 carbamoyl phosphate + N2-succinyl-L-ornithine  phosphate + N-succinyl-L-citrulline

This enzyme is specific for N-succinyl-L-ornithine.

References

External links 
 

EC 2.1.3